Ökologisches Wirtschaften is an academic journal for socioeconomics and ecological economics.

The journal relates new research approaches to practical experience in politics and business. Discussions of the conflict between economy, ecology and society, and new ideas for a future-oriented, sustainable economy are presented.

In the archive, all articles published since 1986 are available online.

See also 

 journal Ecological Economics

External links 

 Ökologisches Wirtschaften online – Open Access Portal

Publications established in 1986
Ecology journals
German economics journals
Academic journals of Germany
German-language journals
Quarterly journals